Harrison station is a commuter rail stop on the Metro-North Railroad's New Haven Line, located in Harrison, New York, United States. During peak hours, some local trains (namely those not subsidized by the Connecticut Department of Transportation) originate or terminate here as opposed to locals from Stamford.

History

Railroad service through Harrison dates back to the 1840s when the New York and New Haven Railroad laid tracks through the town. Unfortunately, it was little more than a flag stop until NY&NE built a station in 1870, before the line was acquired by the New York, New Haven and Hartford Railroad in 1872. Between 1927 and 1937, it also served as a station for the New York, Westchester and Boston Railway (NYW&B), and was one of two stations in Harrison to serve the NYW&B, the other one was at West Street and lasted just as long.

As with all New Haven Line stations in Westchester County, the station became a Penn Central station upon acquisition by the Penn Central Railroad in 1969. The station was updated in 1972 from low-level to high-level platforms. This was done to accommodate the arrival of new rail cars known then as Cosmopolitans, now more commonly known as M2s. The new cars did not include boarding steps, or traps, as their predecessor 4400 Pullman "Washboard" cars did, and could only board passengers at stations with high-level platforms.  This reconstruction project was taking place despite Penn Central's continuous financial despair throughout the 1970s, which forced them to turn over their commuter service to the Metropolitan Transportation Authority. MTA transferred the station to Metro-North in 1983.

Consolidated Edison and Metro-North installed a temporary substation at Harrison on September 28 in an effort to help alleviate the outage for Monday's regular services.

Station layout
The station has two high-level side platforms each 10 cars long. Both platforms were added in 1972. 

As of August 2006, weekday commuter ridership was 2,211 and there are 739 parking spots.

References

External links

Metro-North Railroad stations in New York (state)
Stations on the Northeast Corridor
Harrison, New York
Stations along New York, New Haven and Hartford Railroad lines
Railway stations in Westchester County, New York
1870 establishments in New York (state)